Na Yoon-kyung (born 24 November 1982) is a South Korean sports shooter. She competed in the Women's 10 metre air rifle and 50 metre rifle (3 positions) events at the 2012 Summer Olympics.

References

External links
 

1982 births
Living people
South Korean female sport shooters
Olympic shooters of South Korea
Shooters at the 2012 Summer Olympics
Sport shooters from Seoul
Asian Games medalists in shooting
Shooters at the 2006 Asian Games
Shooters at the 2010 Asian Games
Shooters at the 2014 Asian Games
Asian Games gold medalists for South Korea
Asian Games silver medalists for South Korea
Asian Games bronze medalists for South Korea
Medalists at the 2006 Asian Games
Medalists at the 2010 Asian Games
Medalists at the 2014 Asian Games
20th-century South Korean women
21st-century South Korean women